Yasin Güreler (born 2 July 1991) is a Turkish football player who plays as a left-back for Ankaragücü.

Professional career
Güreler is a youth product of İzmir Gençlikvespor, Altay, Çamdibi Altınokspor, Türk Telekomspor and Yeşilova. He became a professional with Menemenspor in the TFF Third League in 2011, and played there for 7 years where he helped them achieve promotion to the TFF Second League. He transferred to Hatayspor in the summer of 2018, and he helped them win the 2019–20 season. On 15 August 2020, he transferred to Tuzlaspor on a free transfer. He moved to Ankaragücü in the summer of 2021, and again won the TFF First League, earning promotion to the Süper Lig. He made his Süper Lig debut with Ankaragücü in a 2–1 loss to Alanyaspor on 9 September 2022, scoring his side's only goal.

Honours
Hatayspor
 TFF First League: 2019–20

Ankaragücü
 TFF First League: 2021–22

References

External links
 
 

1991 births
Living people
People from Konak
Turkish footballers
Menemenspor footballers
Hatayspor footballers
MKE Ankaragücü footballers
Tuzlaspor players
Süper Lig players
TFF First League players
TFF Second League players
TFF Third League players
Association football fullbacks